This is a list of women writers who were born in Latvia or whose writings are closely associated with that country.

A
Amanda Aizpuriete (born 1956), poet, translator, poetry translated into several languages
Aspazija, pen name of Elza Pliekšāne, (1865–1943), poet, playwright, journalist, feminist

B
Ingmāra Balode (born 1981), poet, translator
Vizma Belševica (1931–2005), widely translated poet, semi-autobiographical novelist
Lija Brīdaka (1932–2022), poet 
Anna Brigadere (1861–1933), playwright, autobiographer

E
Regīna Ezera, pen name of Regīna Šamreto (1930–2002), novelist, short story writer

H
Maria Holm (1845–1912), poet, playwright, wrote in German

J
Elfriede Jaksch (1842–1897), German-language novelist, short story writer
Ilze Jaunalksne (born 1976), journalist, television presenter

K
Ivande Kaija (1876–1942), feminist, journalist, novelist
Mirdza Ķempe (1907–1974), poet, playwright, translator
Velga Krile (1945–1991), acclaimed poet, playwright 
Monta Kroma (1919–1994), modernist poet 
Marta Krūmiņa-Vitrupe (1908–2010), poet, essayist, chess player

L
Nechama Leibowitz (1905–1997), Latvian-born biblical scholar, biblical studies in Hebrew

M
Zenta Mauriņa (1897–1978), biographer, essayist, novelist, short story writer, wrote in Latvian and German

N
Aīda Niedra (1899–1972), novelist and poet

P
Margarita Perveņecka (born 1976), playwright, novelist

S
Irina Saburova (1907–1979), Latvian-born Russian novelist, poet, journalist, translator
Anna Sakse (1905–1981), writer, editor and translator
Rūta Skujiņa (1907–1964), Latvian poet
Margarita Stāraste-Bordevīka (1914–2014), children's writer
Lelde Stumbre (born 1952), playwright

T
Daina Taimina (born 1954), mathematician, acclaimed writings on mathematics
Velta Toma (1912–1999), poet

V
Vaira Vīķe-Freiberga (born 1937), President of Latvia, essayist, non-fiction writer, writings on folk songs

Z
Māra Zālīte (born 1952), poet, publisher
Inga Žolude (born 1984), novelist, short story writer, playwright, translator

See also
List of Latvians
List of women writers

References

-
Latvian
Writers
Writers, women